This is a listing of the film and television appearances of actor Charlton Heston. Several of his radio credits are listed as well.

Filmography

1941–1959

1961–1970

1971–1980

1982–2003

Box office ranking
For several years the Quigley Company's Poll of Film Exhibitors ranked Heston as one of the most popular stars in the US:
1953 - 23rd
1960 - 16th
1961 - 18th
1962 - 12th most popular

Television

1949–1960

1961–1980

1981–1990

1991–2003

Radio 
Selected appearances:

Further reading

References 

<div style="font-size: 90%">

Male actor filmographies
American filmographies